Sol-Iletsky District is an administrative district (raion), one of the thirty-five in Orenburg Oblast, Russia. It is located in the south of the oblast. Its administrative center is the town of Sol-Iletsk, (which is not administratively a part of the district). Population: 25,424 (2010 Census);

Administrative and municipal status
Within the framework of administrative divisions, Sol-Iletsky District is one of the thirty-five in the oblast. The town of Sol-Iletsk serves as its administrative center, despite being incorporated separately as an administrative unit with the status equal to that of the districts.

As a municipal division, the territory of the district and the territory of the Town of Sol-Iletsk are incorporated together as Sol-Iletsky Urban Okrug. Prior to May 1, 2015, the district was incorporated as Sol-Iletsky Municipal District, with the Town of Sol-Iletsk being incorporated within it as Sol-Iletsk Urban Settlement.

References

Notes

Sources



Districts of Orenburg Oblast